Na Charoen is a tambon (subdistrict) of Det Udom District, in Ubon Ratchathani Province, Thailand. In 2021, it had a population of 7,560 people. Neighbouring subdistricts are (clockwise from the south) Som Sa-at, Na Krasaeng, Sa Saming, Pa Mong, Mueang Det, and Tha Pho Si.

History
Initially, the area was administered by three subdistricts including Na Suang, Som Sa-ad, and Thung Thoeng, but later became a subdistrict in its own right in 1966. Before 1997, the tambon was governed by the Subdistrict Council of Na Charoen (สภาตำบลนาเจริญ), which was later upgraded to the Subdistrict Administrative Organization of Na Charoen on February 23 that year.

In 1983, the western region of the tambon was splintered off to establish a new administrative division, the Na Krasaeng subdistrict.

Geography
The tambon is located in the northwestern region of the Det Udom district, on a plateau with a tropical savanna climate.

Administration
The tambon is divided into 10 administrative villages (mubans; หมู่บ้าน), one of which, Na Charoen village, was further divided into two community groups (Mu; หมู่). The entire area is governed by the Subdistrict Administrative Organization of Na Charoen (องค์การบริหารส่วนตำบลนาเจริญ; Na Charoen SAO).

The following is a list of the subdistrict's mubans, which roughly correspond to the villages, as of the 2021 census.

References

Tambon of Ubon Ratchathani Province